The Isle of Wight Festival 2010 was the ninth revived Isle of Wight Festival to be held at Seaclose Park in Newport on the Isle of Wight. The event ran from 11 until 13 June 2010. Tickets were released on Friday 4 December 2009.

The 2010 event was the last in the current contract with the Isle of Wight Council to take place, tying in with the last event for Festival First, guaranteeing festival-goers a ticket for three years. Event organisers Solo are in discussion with the Isle of Wight Council to seal a deal to guarantee the Festival continue for a further ten years.

The first acts were confirmed as Jay-Z, The Strokes, Blondie, Pink, Squeeze and Orbital.

Line up
The complete line up was as follows:

Main stage
Friday
Jay-Z
Florence and the Machine
Calvin Harris
Doves
Mr Hudson
Hockey
Waterburner

Saturday
The Strokes
Blondie
Biffy Clyro
Vampire Weekend
Crowded House
Paloma Faith
The Hold Steady
Melanie Safka
Detroit Social Club

Sunday
Paul McCartney
Pink
Editors
Spandau Ballet
Friendly Fires
The Courteeners
Suzanne Vega
The Coronas
Paper Romance

Big Top
Thursday (campers and Festival First only)
Squeeze
Are You Experienced

Friday
Suzi Quatro
Juliette Lewis
Marina And The Diamonds
Shakespears Sister
Wonderland
Woman
Daisy Dares You
I Blame Coco

Saturday
Orbital
La Roux
N Dubz
The Saturdays
Noah And The Whale
Devendra Banhart
Bombay Bicycle Club
Semi-Precious Weapons
The Brilliant Things
The Arcadian Kicks

Sunday
James
Ocean Colour Scene
Local Natives
Reef
Steve Harley and Cockney Rebel
The Big Pink
The Alarm
Saint Jude

References

External links
 Isle of Wight Festival Official Website

2010
2010 in England
2010 in British music
21st century on the Isle of Wight